Thomas Schäfer (22 February 1966 – 28 March 2020) was a German lawyer and politician for the Christian Democratic Union of Germany (CDU). He was Minister of Finance of Hesse between 2010 and 2020.

Early life and education
Schäfer was born in Hemer and grew up in Biedenkopf. He studied law at the University of Marburg, graduating in 1997. 

From 1998 onward he worked as a lawyer for the Commerzbank in Frankfurt am Main.

Political career 
in 1980, Schäfer joined the CDU/CSU youth organisation Junge Union and was a board member from 1985 to 1999. After the 1999 Hessian state election, Schäfer led the office of Christean Wagner, the minister of justice in Hesse, and from 2002 the office of Minister President Roland Koch. From November 2005 until 2009, he was secretary of state for Jürgen Banzer, minister of labour, family and health. During the financial crisis of 2007–08, he coordinated state efforts to rescue Opel, based in Rüsselsheim am Main, in conjunction with the other three states where Opel had plants.

He was a member of the Hessischer Landtag, the state parliament, from 2014 onward. In 2018, he was re-elected, this time directly. He was regarded as a likely successor to Bouffier.

On 27 March 2020, he announced, together with the minister of economy, Tarek Al-Wazir, the state's financial help in the COVID-19 pandemic for freelancers and small businesses. Schäfer stated, "The fight against the Corona crisis will not fail because of money." ("")

Death 
On the morning of 28 March 2020, his body was found next to the Cologne–Frankfurt high-speed rail line near Hochheim am Main, and police speculated that he had killed himself. Schäfer's death came "as a shock", as days prior he had expressed that his work was "a pleasure and an honour". He was known as a jovial man with good humor, though he had visibly lost weight for "some time". According to Bouffier, Schäfer was concerned about managing the financial response to the coronavirus pandemic. He was survived by his wife and two children. His successor as minister of finance is Michael Boddenberg.

References

External links 

 
 Dr. Thomas Schäfer Landtag Hessen
 Bouffier krempelt Kochs Kabinett um (in German) 30 August 2010 Der Spiegel

1966 births
2020 deaths
Ministers of Finance of Hesse
Ministers of the Hesse State Government
Members of the Landtag of Hesse
People from Marburg-Biedenkopf
Christian Democratic Union of Germany politicians
German bankers
20th-century German lawyers
University of Marburg alumni
21st-century German politicians
Suicides by train
Suicides in Germany
2020 suicides